Prankenstein is a 2022 Indian Bengali language Psychological thriller web series directed by Sagnik Chatterjee and produced by Milky Way Films. The series starring Kaushik Ganguly, Dip Dey, Sritama Dey, Remoo and Ipsita Kundu are in the lead roles. The music for the film is scored by Rajdeep Ganguly and cinematography is done by Arindam Bhattacharjee. The music for the film is scored by Rajdeep Ganguly and cinematography is done by Arindam Bhattacharjee.

Plot
A renowned prankster group ‘Prankenstein’ has been invited to the YouTube Fan Fest in Mumbai this year. To celebrate the occasion, they go to party overnight in an old Palace on the city outskirts. However, some strange incidents alter their course of life. After reaching the palace, the boys (Ruben and Vicky) go ahead to buy some beers while the girls (Shireen and Aru) stay in their party-room. When the boys return, they are astonished to witness what they see in the room. A middle-aged man is holding the girls at gunpoint, while they clutched on to each other, trembling heavily with fear. The kidnapper claims that he is a diehard follower of their YouTube channel, and he always wanted this opportunity to meet them in person. He too, had a prank channel on YouTube previously, but could not make it big. He resented them initially, but later realized that this group had something in them, that he lacked. Therefore, as a diehard follower, he wanted to make them do a prank of his own choice.

However, they have no option but to agree to his demands. He hands them his first suggestion of a prank, which they must finish as a task. The prank seems like an easy one and an effortless task for the pranksters as they had done much bigger and better pranks than this one. But when they pursue the trail, things take a nasty turn, and they end up killing an innocent person, involved in their prank. In paranoia, fear, and haste, they rush back to the palace to find their kidnapper, watching pictures of their killing on his laptop. Since they did could not complete the prank successfully, they are told to do a second task.

Unfortunately, this time another person gets killed accidentally by them. Panic-stricken for having committed two murders in one night, the group rushes back to the palace to confront their handler. They get perplexed to see that their handler has these entire proceedings on tape, too, and fear that any retaliation from their end may see them behind bars.

Season 1 (2022)
The first season of Prankenstein started streaming in April 2022 on Klikk Ott platform.

Episodes

Soundtrack
1. Prankenstein (Original Score from the series)

2. Prankenstein (Music from the Series)

Cast 
Kaushik Ganguly
Dip Dey as Ruben
Sritama Dey as Shireen
Ipsita Kundu as Aaru
Remoo as Vicky
Rohini Chatterjee as Gauri
Bhaskar Dutta as Taxi Driver
Somnath Bhattacharjee as Mr. Goswami
Priyadarshini Dasgupta as Mrs. Goswami
Ayantika Paul as Daughter

References

External links 
 

Bengali-language web series